Muhammad Sadiq (born 29 September 1938) is a Pakistani sprinter. He competed in the men's 400 metres at the 1964 Summer Olympics.

References

1938 births
Living people
Athletes (track and field) at the 1964 Summer Olympics
Pakistani male sprinters
Olympic athletes of Pakistan
Place of birth missing (living people)